Cobblestone Mountain is a peak in the Topatopa Mountains, in Ventura County, about  north of Piru, California. At , it is the highest peak of the Topatopa Mountains. Second highest is Hines Peak. Snow frequently falls on the mountain during winter.

Overview
When viewing the Topatopa Mountains from the east, Cobblestone Mountain is the most visibly prominent mountain of the entire range. It can be seen from the Santa Clarita Valley, the San Fernando Valley from higher areas, on the westbound descent of the Santa Susana Pass on State Route 118, and in Gorman heading southbound on Interstate 5

The peak is in the Sespe Wilderness, which is part of the Los Padres National Forest.

See also
 Topatopa Mountains
 Los Padres National Forest
 Transverse Ranges

References

Topatopa Mountains
Mountains of Ventura County, California
Los Padres National Forest
Mountains of Southern California